General elections were held in Peru on 14 April 1985 to elect the President and both houses of the Congress. Alan García of the American Popular Revolutionary Alliance won the presidential election with 53.1% of the vote, whilst his party gained a majority in both houses of Congress.

Results

President

Senate
Former President Terry was appointed a Senator for life after the end of his presidential term. He represented Popular Action. Within the APRA–DC–SODE coalition, the American Popular Revolutionary Alliance won 30 seats and the Christian Democrat Party and Solidarity and Democracy one each.

Chamber of Deputies

References

1985 in Peru
Elections in Peru
Peru
Presidential elections in Peru
April 1985 events in South America